Part I: John Shade, Your Fortune's Made is the first studio album by the Los Angeles band Fol Chen.  It was released on Asthmatic Kitty Records in February 2009.

Track listing 
 The Believers - 3:59
 No Wedding Cake - 3:35
 You and Your Sister in Jericho - 5:57
 The Idiot - 3:07
 Red Skies Over Garden City (The Ballad of Donna Donna) - 4:09
 Winter, That's All - 4:21
 Cable TV - 3:04
 Please, John, You're Killing Me - 4:34
 The Longer U Wait - 5:18
 If Tuesday Comes - 3:31

References

External links 
 Impose magazine review

2009 debut albums
Fol Chen albums
Asthmatic Kitty albums